Pedro Javier Muñoz González (born September 19, 1968) is a former outfielder in Major League Baseball. He played seven seasons in the majors, from  until , for the Minnesota Twins and Oakland Athletics. He hit his first MLB home run off the Milwaukee Brewer's Darren Holmes on May 16, 1991, and his first grand slam a month later against the New York Yankees.

in 517 games over 7 seasons, Muñoz compiled a .273 batting average (467-for-1708) with 203 runs, 75 doubles, 8 triples, 67 home runs, 252 RBI, 100 bases on balls, 418 strikeouts, .315 on-base percentage and .444 slugging percentage. Defensively, he recorded a .976 fielding percentage.

External links

1968 births
Living people
Dunedin Blue Jays players
Florence Blue Jays players
Gulf Coast Blue Jays players
Knoxville Blue Jays players
Major League Baseball left fielders
Major League Baseball players from Puerto Rico
Major League Baseball right fielders
Minnesota Twins players
Oakland Athletics players
Portland Beavers players
Sportspeople from Ponce, Puerto Rico
Syracuse Chiefs players